Maraneh may refer to:
 Maraneh, Kurdistan
 Maraneh, Mahabad, West Azerbaijan Province
 Maraneh, Sardasht, West Azerbaijan Province